

Road classification

Route numbers
The ACT generally does not number its highway and freeway grade roads; those that are numbered, are interstate highways and their connecting roads. The ACT is preparing to introduce the NSW alpha-numeric route system for these thoroughfares. The new system will be implemented in 2013 at the same time as NSW completes its own transition to alphanumeric numbering.

Road hierarchy
The ACT classifies its roads into four groups, depending on its physical properties and role within the road network:

Arterial roads
These roads serve long distance travellers within or between districts, and support large volumes of traffic. They may be limited access, or controlled-access. A small number of these roads have relatively high levels of property access due to city design requirements at the time.

Major collector roads
These roads serve local area traffic distributing to or from minor collector roads, and also link to the arterial network. Well designed property access is permissible.

Minor collector roads
These roads serve neighbourhood traffic, and provide access from the major collector roads into residential areas. Normal direct property access is permissible at this level. Secondary links to the arterial network are possible.

Access streets
These streets are the lowest road type in the hierarchy, and provide access to the bulk of residential homes.

List of major roadways in the ACT

Controlled-access roads
Controlled-access roads in the ACT are often known as parkways either by name, or at some stage during their development, these generally (but not always) travel through peripheral areas between urbanised regions.
 Majura Parkway
Gungahlin Drive Extension – John Dedman Parkway during planning stage
Capital Circle
Parkes Way* – controlled-access western extension known as the Molonglo Parkway during planning stage
Tuggeranong Parkway
Adelaide Avenue
Yarra Glen – Woden Parkway during planning stage
*Partially limited-access

Limited-access roads
 Athllon Drive
 Barry Drive
  Barton Highway
 Belconnen Way
  Canberra Avenue
  Commonwealth Avenue
 Constitution Avenue
 Drakeford Drive
 Fairbairn Avenue
  Federal Highway
 Ginninderra Drive
 Gungahlin Drive
 Hindmarsh Drive
 Isabella Drive
 Kings Avenue
  Kings Highway
 Limestone Avenue
 Majura Road
  Monaro Highway^ – controlled-access northern extension known as the Eastern Parkway during planning stage
  Northbourne Avenue
  State Circle
 Tharwa Drive
 William Hovell Drive
  Vernon Circle
 Yamba Drive
^Partially controlled-access

Major Interchanges
 Glenloch Interchange

Tourist Drives
The ACT previously had 7 colour coded and themed tourist drives explore the city and nearby bushland. While some signs remain, tourist drives have been officially decommissioned in the ACT.
  Tourist Drive 1
  Tourist Drive 2
  Tourist Drive 3
  Tourist Drive 4
  Tourist Drive 5
  Tourist Drive 6
  Tourist Drive 7

Canberra is also the southern terminus of the Remembrance Driveway, which is a system of arboreal parks, plantations, and road-side rest areas dedicated to former and current members of the Australian Defence Force. There are also memorial parks and rest areas along the route which honour Australia's Victoria Cross recipients.

See also

 Highways in Australia for highways in other states and territories
 List of highways in Australia for roads named as highways, but not necessarily classified as highways

References

Canberra
 
Roads
Transport in Canberra